Ketleyn Lima Quadros (born 1 October 1987) is a Brazilian judoka. She won the bronze medal in the 57 kg weight class at the 2008 Summer Olympics, and became the first Brazilian woman to win an Olympic medal in an individual sport.

Personal life
When she is not competing, Ketleyn Quadros enjoys traveling, family, friends and barbecue.

Judo career
Quadros started practicing judo at the age of 7 when she saw a class while on the way to swimming class. She competed in judo and swimming until the age of 12 and then switched to judo full time.

At the 2008 Beijing Olympic, Quadros became the first Brazilian woman to win a medal in the Olympic Games in an individual sport.

In 2021, Ketleyn Quadros won gold at the 2021 Pan American Judo Championships at 63 kilograms. She competed at the 2020 Summer Olympics. At the 2021 Judo Grand Slam Abu Dhabi held in Abu Dhabi, United Arab Emirates, she won one of the bronze medals in her event.

References

External links
 
 Ketleyn Quadros at Beijing 2008 (archived)

1987 births
Living people
Judoka at the 2008 Summer Olympics
Olympic judoka of Brazil
Olympic bronze medalists for Brazil
Olympic medalists in judo
Medalists at the 2008 Summer Olympics
Brazilian female judoka
Universiade medalists in judo
Sportspeople from Brasília
South American Games gold medalists for Brazil
South American Games medalists in judo
Competitors at the 2010 South American Games
Universiade gold medalists for Brazil
Medalists at the 2013 Summer Universiade
Judoka at the 2020 Summer Olympics
21st-century Brazilian women